The scaly-crowned honeyeater (Sugomel lombokium) is a species of bird in the family Meliphagidae.  It is endemic to Indonesia, where it occurs in the Lesser Sunda Islands.  Its natural habitats are subtropical or tropical moist lowland forests and subtropical or tropical moist montane forests.

Prior to 2022, it was classified in the genus Lichmera as Lichmera lombokia. However, the International Ornithological Congress reclassified it into the genus Sugomel based on phylogenetic evidence finding L. lombokia to be the sister species of the black honeyeater (S. niger).

References

scaly-crowned honeyeater
Birds of the Lesser Sunda Islands
Birds of Flores
scaly-crowned honeyeater
Taxonomy articles created by Polbot